The 2007 Yobe State gubernatorial election occurred on April 14, 2007. ANPP candidate Mamman Bello Ali won the election, defeating PDP Adamu Waziri and other candidates.

Results
Mamman Bello Ali from the ANPP won the election. He defeated Adamu Waziri of the PDP and others.

The total number of registered voters in the state was 994,380.

Mamman Bello Ali, (ANPP)- 210,166

Adamu Waziri, PDP- 186,399

Zayanu Abagana, ADC- 34,052

Tijani Tunsa, AD- 30,444

References 

Yobe State gubernatorial election
Yobe State gubernatorial election
2007